The province of Pescara is a province in the Abruzzo region of Italy. Its provincial capital is the city Pescara, which has a population of 119,483 inhabitants. The provincial president is Antonio Zaffiri and the province contains 46 comuni.

History
Pescara's first indicators of settlement date to 1500 BCE, but it is unknown which tribe first settled in the city. It was conquered by the Romans in 214 BCE and remained "Aternum" after the city allied itself with Punic Carthaginian military commander Hannibal. The Romans developed the city and it became an important location for shipping and trade occurring between the Balkans and Rome; the Romans made the city of Pescara the capital of the Valeria region. During the barbarian raids it was almost completely destroyed, and it developed into a fishing village named Piscaria.

Charles V, Holy Roman Emperor turned Piscaria into a military fort named Pescara during the sixteenth century, and Pescara survived a series of invasions from Turkish Muslims. It was ruled by the Austrians for a short period of the 1700s before falling under the control of the House of Bourbon; the House of Bourbon made it a component of Abruzzo Citra. It joined the Kingdom of Italy in 1860 and was still mainly fortified and Pescara was made a new provincial capital in 1927. In World War II, 78% of the city was destroyed by bombers.

Geography
The province of Pescara is the central of four provinces in the region of Abruzzo on the eastern coast of Italy. It is bounded to the northeast by the Adriatic Sea. The Province of Teramo lies to the north and the Province of L'Aquila to the west and south. To the south and east lies the Province of Chieti. The provincial capital is the city and port of Pescara, situated at the mouth of the Aterno-Pescara River.

Comuni

 Abbateggio
 Alanno
 Bolognano
 Brittoli
 Bussi sul Tirino
 Cappelle sul Tavo
 Caramanico Terme
 Carpineto della Nora
 Castiglione a Casauria
 Catignano
 Cepagatti
 Città Sant'Angelo
 Civitaquana
 Civitella Casanova
 Collecorvino
 Corvara
 Cugnoli
 Elice
 Farindola
 Lettomanoppello
 Loreto Aprutino
 Manoppello
 Montebello di Bertona
 Montesilvano
 Moscufo
 Nocciano
 Penne
 Pescara
 Pescosansonesco
 Pianella
 Picciano
 Pietranico
 Popoli
 Roccamorice
 Rosciano
 Salle
 San Valentino in Abruzzo Citeriore
 Sant'Eufemia a Maiella
 Scafa
 Serramonacesca
 Spoltore
 Tocco da Casauria
 Torre de' Passeri
 Turrivalignani
 Vicoli
 Villa Celiera

Main sights

Pescara 

The city is divided in two by the river.

The historic city center is located on the south shore, where once stood the Piazzaforte (fortified town), a military bulwark of the Kingdom of the Two Sicilies.  There is the Bagno Borbonico (the old prison of the Kingdom of the Two Sicilies, built starting in 1510 by order of Charles V, which incorporated inside the remains of the Norman and Byzantine city walls). Today it houses the Museum of the Abruzzi people: the institution  traces, towards 13 halls dedicated to the aspects of life, traditions and economy, 4,000 years of history of the Abruzzo people.

In the historic city center are the birthplace houses of Gabriele D'Annunzio and Ennio Flaiano, and the San Cetteo Cathedral, build between 1933 and 1938.

On the north shore of the river there's Piazza Italia (Italy Square), overlooked by the City Hall and the Government Building (which houses the headquarters of the Province of Pescara), both built during the Fascist era according to the fascist rationalist style and designed by the architect Vincenzo Pilotti. Mr. Pilotti designed the majority of the public buildings of the city, including the seat of the local Chamber of Commerce, of the Liceo Classico "G. D'Annunzio" high school, and the old seat of the court (which now houses a museum).

In the very south part of the city, between the D'Avalos Park and the beach, there is an elegant Art Nouveau villas district designed in 1912 by Antonino Liberi (an engineer brother-in-law of D'Annunzio). There is also the Aurum, first headquarters of a social club (called the Kursaal), then liquor factory, and today public multipurpose space.

In 2007 was built the Ponte del Mare, the largest pedestrian and cycle bridge in Italy.

On the northern waterfront, close to the Salotto Square, the main square of the city, there is the Nave (trad. the ship), a sculpture by Pietro Cascella.

National Park of Majella 
Abbey of San Clemente (Castiglione a Casauria)
Abbey of San Liberatore (Serramonacesca)
Hermitage of Sant'Onofrio (Serramonacesca)
Hermitage of Santo Spirito (Serramonacesca)
Hermitage of San Bartolomeo (Roccamorice)
Basilica of Holy Draw of Manoppello
Historical center of Penne
Historical center of Loreto Aprutino
Historical center of Città Sant'Angelo

References

External links

Provincia di Pescara homepage 

 
Pescara